Marriage Contract is a 2016 South Korean television series starring Lee Seo-jin and Uee. It aired on MBC from March 5 to April 24, 2016 on Saturdays and Sundays at 22:00 for 16 episodes.

Plot
Kang Hye-soo (Uee) is a single mother who struggles to raise her daughter while paying off her late husband's debts. Han Ji-hoon (Lee Seo-jin) is the son of a chaebol who seeks a contract marriage in order to save his mother, who needs a liver transplant. When Hye-soo is diagnosed with an inoperable brain tumor, she agrees to marry Ji-hoon and donate part of her liver to his mother, in exchange for enough money to provide for her daughter until she reaches adulthood.

Cast
Lee Seo-jin as Han Ji-hoon
Uee as Kang Hye-soo
Kim Yong-gun as Han Seong-gook
Park Jung-soo as Yoon Seon-yeong
Lee Hwi-hyang as Oh Mi-ran
Kim Young-pil as Han Jeong-hoon
Shin Rin-ah as Cha Eun-seong
Kim Kwang-kyu as Park Ho-joon
Kim Yoo-ri as Seo Na-yoon
Jung Kyung-soon as Shim Yeong-hee
Lee Hyun-geol as Kong Soo-chang 
Pyo Ye-jin as Hyun A-ra
Ahn Ji-hoon as Jo Seung-joo
Kim So-jin as Hwang Joo-yeon
Jin Seon-kyu as Oh Mi-ran's doctor

Ratings

Awards and nominations

References

External links
  
 

2016 South Korean television series debuts
MBC TV television dramas
Korean-language television shows
2016 South Korean television series endings
South Korean romance television series
South Korean melodrama television series
Television series by Pan Entertainment